CME. or cme, can refer to any of the following:

Organizations 
 Canadian Military Engineers, the military engineer branch of the Canadian Forces
 Central European Media Enterprises
 Central Music Company (CME), Beijing, China
 Christian Methodist Episcopal Church, a historically black denomination of Methodism, formerly called "Colored Methodist Episcopal Church" 
 CME Group, a financial securities exchange services and information firm
 Chicago Mercantile Exchange, a financial and commodity derivative exchange, owned by CME Group
 College of Military Engineering, Pune, a training institution of the Indian Army Corps of Engineers
 Columbia Music Entertainment, former name for Nippon Columbia, a record label in Tokyo, Japan
 Conseil Mondial de l'Eau, the World Water Council, an international think-tank focused on water issues
 Creighton Manning Engineering, a civil engineering firm in Albany, New York

Physiology and medicine 
 Chief medical examiner, common official title of a coroner
 Continuing medical education
 Clathrin-mediated endocytosis, another name for receptor-mediated endocytosis (RME)
 Cystoid macular edema, an eye disorder also known as Irvine–Gass syndrome

Science and technology 
 Computer mediated environment, creation of alternate reality through computer interfaces
 Concurrent Machine Environment, a computing environment supporting ICL Direct Machine Environment
 Coronal mass ejection, a massive burst of stellar wind and other ejecta from a star

Transport 
 Chief mechanical engineer, the chief officer of a railway responsible for locomotives and rolling stock
 CME, the IATA code for Ciudad del Carmen International Airport, Campeche, Mexico
 CME, the ICAO code for Prince Edward Air, a defunct airline based on Prince Edward Island, Canada
 CME, the National Rail code for Combe railway station in the county of Oxfordshire, UK

Other uses 
 cme, the ISO 639-3 code for the Cerma language spoken in Burkina Faso
 CME, the ITU country code for Cameroon

See also